Rebersburg Historic District is a national historic district located at Miles Township, Centre County, Pennsylvania.  The district includes 205 contributing buildings in Rebersburg.  The district is almost exclusively residential with three churches, a small luncheonette, an old schoolhouse, one grocery store and a post office.  Among the types of residential building types present are the row house, connected or double houses, Continental four-over-four, Pennsylvania four-over-four, and Victorian Gothic type.  Notable dwellings include the Jacob Major John Reynolds House (1820), Robert Tate House (1810), Daniel Walker House (1840), Philip Reitzell Tavern (1821), Colonel Henry Royer House (1823), John Bierly Sr. House (1830), Dr. John J. Hilbish House and Office (1853, Daniel Brungart House (1875), Emma J. Royer House (1897), and James E. Ziegler House (1908).

It was added to the National Register of Historic Places in 1979.

Gramley Schoolhouse Museum

The schoolhouse was used for younger grades and as an additional room for instruction at the newer elementary school. It was relocated to its current site a few yards away on Town Lane Road in 2011 through an effort led by Vonnie Henninger and became a museum open to the public on May 2, 2015. The museum houses collections from the Gramley Schoolhouse, the former Miles Township High School, and exhibits on historical residents of Rebersburg. The museum also acts as a genealogical center for Miles Township.

Gallery

References

Historic districts on the National Register of Historic Places in Pennsylvania
Georgian architecture in Pennsylvania
Gothic Revival architecture in Pennsylvania
Historic districts in Centre County, Pennsylvania
National Register of Historic Places in Centre County, Pennsylvania